Del Matthew Bigtree is an American television and film producer as well as CEO of the anti-vaccination group Informed Consent Action Network. He produced the film Vaxxed: From Cover-Up to Catastrophe, based on the discredited opinions of Andrew Wakefield and alleges an unsubstantiated connection between vaccines and autism.

His frequent public speaking engagements and a recent influx of funding have made Bigtree, who has no medical training, one of the most prominent voices in the anti-vaccination movement.

During the COVID-19 pandemic, Bigtree propagated conspiracy theories about the origin of the virus, and urged his audience to ignore the advice of health authorities.

Television producer
Bigtree grew up in Boulder, Colorado, the son of Jack Groverland, a minister at the Unity of Boulder Church. He attended the Vancouver Film School and eventually gained employment in the television industry.

He briefly worked on Dr. Phil and was credited as a field producer for five episodes. After a gap of two years, he served on the production team of the medical talk show The Doctors for which he produced 30 episodes over five years, although he has no medical training.

It was while he was working on The Doctors that Bigtree learned of Andrew Wakefield's opposition to the MMR vaccine and his later-discredited claims that the Centers for Disease Control and Prevention hid proof of a link between vaccines and autism. Wakefield was looking for help to produce a film based on his conspiracy theories. Bigtree decided he could assist and left the show to produce, write and appear in Wakefield's film.

Anti-vaccination activism
Bigtree produced the film Vaxxed: From Cover-Up to Catastrophe, based on the discredited views of Andrew Wakefield on an alleged connection between vaccines and autism. The film debuted in 2016 and was widely panned by critics. The epidemiologist Ian Lipkin wrote that "as a documentary it misrepresents what science knows about autism, undermines public confidence in the safety and efficacy of vaccines, and attacks the integrity of legitimate scientists and public-health officials."

However, the film, its promotional bus tour, and funding from the Selz Foundation quickly established Bigtree as an activist in the American anti-vaccination movement. He has since spoken at multiple anti-vaccine events in which he repeats false information about the risks of vaccines and alleges governments are engaged in a vast conspiracy to hide the truth. His anti-vaccine advocacy has been described by medical professionals as fearmongering.

When Bigtree developed an association with Wakefield, several states, including California where Bigtree resided, had begun to consider legislation that would restrict the types of exemptions for which parents could apply to have their unvaccinated children attend schools. Bigtree strongly opposed such bills and has been criticized by the Anti-Defamation League and the Auschwitz-Birkenau Memorial and Museum for wearing a Star of David at an anti-vaccination event in an attempt to compare the treatment of those opposed to vaccination to the persecution of Jews. Often in collaboration with Wakefield and Robert F. Kennedy Jr., Bigtree still lobbies legislators to convince them to keep vaccination exemptions in place.

Bigtree is the chief executive of the anti-vaccination group Informed Consent Action Network (ICAN), for which he received a salary of $221,000 in 2020. Under his leadership, ICAN promotes the conspiracy theory that government officials collude with the pharmaceutical industry to cover up grievous harms from vaccines. Bigtree hosts a regular stream webcast in which he frequently repeats anti-vaccination messages. The webcast is produced by ICAN and often features Kennedy. Before it was shut down in 2020, the YouTube broadcast of The Highwire attracted 174,000 subscribers.

In New York State in 2019, Bigtree was a keynote speaker at several anti-vaccination events targeting the ultra-Orthodox Jewish community in Brooklyn and in Rockland County during a measles epidemic fueled by low vaccination rates. Bigtree gave an anti-vaccine speech as headline speaker at a natural health product conference in Toronto in 2018, but a repeat performance was canceled in 2019 after The Globe and Mail started asking questions.

COVID-19 pandemic
Like other anti-vaccination advocates, Bigtree adapted several of the more popular anti-vaccination themes to the COVID-19 pandemic, promoting distrust in expertise, misrepresenting research results and encouraging the public to let the disease run its course.

He used The Highwire webcast to propagate a number of conspiracy theories, such one postulating that the virus responsible had been made in a laboratory by the pharmaceutical industry. The weekly webcast quickly became a rallying point for anti-vaccination activists and conspiracy theorists early in the pandemic, according to Professor Dorit Reiss, who studies online COVID-19 disinformation. Going against the advice of health authorities, he recommended to his viewers to refuse the vaccine when it is developed and to make efforts to actually infect themselves with the virus, favoring not so much herd immunity as natural selection, with weaker humans dying like the "sick get eaten by the wolves. That's how we've thrived." He accused Anthony Fauci of leading a cabal of conspirators of wanting to vaccinate the whole world population under a false pretence.

Bigtree regularly speaks at events protesting vaccination and public health measures against the pandemic. In October 2020, he speculated to an audience of anti-vaccination activists that the new COVID vaccines may cause diabetes, lupus and other autoimmune diseases, although there is no evidence to support those claims. Bigtree spoke at the January 6, 2021, pro-Trump rally preceding the riot at the Capitol. He took this opportunity to attack federal health authorities and to contest the results of the 2020 presidential election. Other anti-vaccination activists were also present at this "Stop the Steal" rally, such as Ty and Charlene Bollinger. He was one of the main speakers at the Defeat the Mandates rally in Washington D.C. on January 23, 2022, where he said doctors and journalists should be convicted in Nuremberg-like trials.

By 2023, Bigtree was calling for the imprisonment of public health officials and executives of pharmaceutical companies for favoring vaccination against COVID-19 over the use of ineffective drugs such as hydroxychloroquine and ivermectin, alleging people have been murdered in order to further the agenda of sinister globalist interests.

In July 2020, YouTube closed his account and channel for violation of its community standards against pandemic misinformation, and Facebook removed selected videos from Bigtree's account. As of June 2021, Bigtree's show The Highwire was still being distributed on Twitter. In August 2020, Bigtree announced that his videos were now distributed on Roku media players, despite the company's prohibition against content that is found to include "false, irrelevant or misleading information". He also found a receptive audience on Rumble, a video-sharing platform that does not have misinformation policies. The Highwire website itself is attracting some one million visitors per month, making it one of the most popular alternative websites.

Filmography

See also
Herd immunity
COVID-19 misinformation
Vaccine hesitancy
Science Moms

References

Year of birth missing (living people)
Living people
American television producers
American documentary film producers
People from Colorado
Autism pseudoscience
American conspiracy theorists
COVID-19 conspiracy theorists
American anti-vaccination activists